Banuband-e Pasang (also Romanized as Banūband-e Pāsang; also known as Banūband-e Pāsīan and Benū Band-e Pāsang) is a village in Tazian Rural District, in the Central District of Bandar Abbas County, Hormozgan Province, Iran. At the 2006 census, its population was 693, in 144 families.

References 

Populated places in Bandar Abbas County